Muelas del Pan is a municipality located in the province of Zamora, Castile and León, Spain.

According to the 2004 census (INE), the municipality had a population of 844 inhabitants.

See also
Tierra del Pan

References

Municipalities of the Province of Zamora